Christian Brothers Academy (CBA) is a private Catholic college preparatory school in suburban Syracuse, New York run by the Brothers of the Christian Schools, founded by St. John Baptist de La Salle.  Located within the Roman Catholic Diocese of Syracuse, the school has more than 750 students in grades seven through twelve. It was founded in 1900 by the Christian Brothers, who still run the school, though most of the teachers are laity. In 1960, it moved from its original site on Willow Street in downtown Syracuse to its current location in suburban Dewitt on Randall Road. CBA was a boys-only school until September 1987. CBA opened to girls after Syracuse's all-girls school, The Franciscan Academy, closed and many of those parents actively lobbied to have CBA accept female students.

In 2019, CBA was named a National Blue Ribbon School of Excellence, one of 50 private schools nationally, and the only private school in New York State. CBA was also ranked as the No. 1 Catholic high school in all of Upstate New York by NYup.com.

Niche.com ranks CBA as the #1 best Catholic High School in the Syracuse area.

In the past 25 years, the school has captured State Championships in baseball, boys basketball, football, girls lacrosse (4 state titles), boys lacrosse, boys soccer, ice hockey and cross country. In addition, individuals have won State Titles in track and swimming.

Tuition
As of the 2022–23 school year, tuition information is as follows:

7th and 8th Grades

$11,500+ $295 activity fee

9th-12th Grades

$11,885+ $295 activity fee

Notable alumni

Notable alumni include:
Jody C Baumgartner, THCAS Distinguished Professor, East Carolina University
Earl Belcher, basketball player, St. Bonaventure, NBA San Antonio Spurs
Frank Cappelletti, Villanova University football player, coach and athletic director at Christian Brothers Academy 
Sen. John DeFrancisco
Riley Dixon, NFL player
Marty Domres, NFL player
Frank Riccelli, Major League Baseball pitcher
John Robert Greene, historian and author
Fr. Borys Gudziak, director of Ukrainian Catholic University
Billy Owens, football player, University of Pittsburgh, NFL Dallas Cowboys
Walt Patulski, University of Notre Dame and NFL football player, top pick of 1972 NFL draft
Greg Paulus, Head basketball coach Niagara University men's basketball, Duke University basketball player and Syracuse University football player
Joe Papaleo, Syracuse University, All Pro Soccer player, 1993, 1994
Nicholas J. Pirro, former Onondaga County executive
Mark Reed, physicist
Kathryn Smith, first full-time female National Football League coach
James T. Walsh, former Congressman
Kyle Barker, Cordinator of Broadcast and Multimedia Production at Niagara University.

References

External links
 Christian Brothers Academy Syracuse

Lasallian schools in the United States
Catholic secondary schools in New York (state)
Educational institutions established in 1903
Roman Catholic Diocese of Syracuse
Schools in Onondaga County, New York
Private middle schools in New York (state)
DeWitt, New York
1903 establishments in New York (state)